Levan is a town in Juab County, Utah, United States. As of the 2020 census it had a population of 862.

It is often said that the name of the town derives from its location near the center of Utah, because the name is "navel" spelled backwards. Several other origins have been suggested for the name, from French, Latin, or Colorado River Numic language.

Geography
Levan is in eastern Juab County, in the Juab Valley at the western base of the San Pitch Mountains. Utah State Route 28 passes through the town, leading north  to Nephi, the county seat, and south  to Gunnison. Utah State Route 78 leads southwest from Levan  to Interstate 15 near Chicken Creek Reservoir.

Climate
This climatic region is typified by large seasonal temperature differences, with hot summers and cold (sometimes severely cold) winters.  According to the Köppen Climate Classification system, Levan has a humid continental climate, abbreviated "Dfa" on climate maps.

Demographics

As of the census of 2000, there were 688 people, 219 households, and 183 families residing in the town. The population density was 900.7 people per square mile (349.5/km2). There were 258 housing units at an average density of 337.7 per square mile (131.1/km2). The racial makeup of the town was 97.38% White, 0.15% African American, 0.15% Native American, 0.29% Pacific Islander, 0.15% from other races, and 1.89% from two or more races. 3.49% of the population were Hispanic or Latino of any race.

There were 219 households, out of which 49.8% had children under the age of 18 living with them, 69.4% were married couples living together, 10.5% had a female householder with no husband present, and 16.0% were non-families. 15.1% of all households were made up of individuals, and 6.8% had someone living alone who was 65 years of age or older. The average household size was 3.14 and the average family size was 3.49.

In the town, the population was spread out, with 37.2% under the age of 18, 8.4% from 18 to 24, 26.3% from 25 to 44, 17.3% from 45 to 64, and 10.8% who were 65 years of age or older. The median age was 28 years. For every 100 females, there were 103.6 males. For every 100 females age 18 and over, there were 96.4 males.

The median income for a household in the town was $34,632, and the median income for a family was $36,250. Males had a median income of $33,500 versus $18,750 for females. The per capita income for the town was $12,260. 6.1% of the population and 5.1% of families were below the poverty line. Out of the total population, 3.4% of those under the age of 18 and 8.8% of those 65 and older were living below the poverty line.

See also

 List of cities and towns in Utah

References

External links

 Town of Levan official website

Towns in Juab County, Utah
Towns in Utah
Populated places established in 1867